Mount Fox is a rural locality in the Shire of Hinchinbrook, Queensland, Australia. In the  Mount Fox had a population of 87 people.

Geography 
Mount Fox is a locality on the western side of the Great Dividing Range. The eastern side of the locality is mountainous and undeveloped; much of it is within the Girrigun National Park and the Lannercost State Forest. The locality presumably takes its name from that mountain.

History 
Mount Fox State School opened on 12 February 1938 but it closed in December 1941. It reopened on 28 July 1954 but closed on 2 September 1955. It reopened on 11 May 1959 but closed again on 6 July 1964. It reopened on 28 January 1988.

In the  Mount Fox had a population of 87 people.

Education 
Mount Fox State School is a government primary (Early Childhood-6) school for boys and girls at 2957 Mt Fox Road. In 2016, the school had an enrolment of 5 students with 2 teachers (1 full-time equivalent) and 4 non-teaching staff (1 full-time equivalent). In 2018, the school had an enrolment of 5 students with 2 teachers (1 full-time equivalent) and 5 non-teaching staff (2 full-time equivalent).

There is no secondary school in Mount Fox. The nearest secondary school is Ingham State High School in Ingham to the north-east.

References

Further reading

External links 

Shire of Hinchinbrook
Localities in Queensland